Omorgus gigas is a species of hide beetle in the subfamily Omorginae.

References

gigas
Beetles described in 1872